Francisca Luhong James (born 14 October 1995) is a Malaysian model and beauty pageant titleholder who was crowned Miss Universe Malaysia 2020. She represents her country at Miss Universe 2020, where she ended up did not make it into the top 21 semi-finalist, thus her journey was marked in the “50 years of unplacement” for Malaysia in Miss Universe history since Josephine Lena Wong in 1970.

Early life and career
James was born in Kuching, Sarawak, is a mixed of Kayan, Kenyah, and Iban with her native roots of Dayak. She is the eldest of 3 siblings and the only daughter of James Mering Bungan and Pauline Japok. She also holds a Degree in Mass Communication majoring in Public Relations.

Pageantry

Miss Cultural Harvest Festival 2015 
At 19, James participated in Miss Cultural Harvest Festival 2015, an ethnic beauty pageant held annually during the Sarawak Harvest and Folklore Festival. She was placed as the second runner-up of the competition.

Miss World Malaysia

Miss World Malaysia 2016 
In 2016, James was one of the finalists in the Miss World Malaysia 2016 pageant. She also won 3 of the 12 subsidiaries awards which were Miss Talent, Miss Natural Beauty, and Miss Elegant. At the end of the pageant, she ended up in the Top 5 finalist.

Miss World Malaysia 2018 
Two years later, James tried her luck for the second time in Miss World Malaysia pageant, She won 2 of 6 subsidiaries awards which were the People's Choice Award and Top Model Award. During Miss World Malaysia 2018, she was one of the Top 5 finalists.

Miss Universe Malaysia 2020 
In 2020, James participated in the Miss Universe Malaysia 2020 pageant and eventually won the pageant. As the winner, she earned the rights to represent Malaysia in Miss Universe 2020 pageant, the finale competition of the 56th Miss Universe Malaysia was held on 5 September 2020 at Damansara, Petaling Jaya, Selangor. James was the eighth Miss Universe Malaysia from Sarawak and also the first Dayak woman.

Miss Universe 2020 
James represented Malaysia at Miss Universe 2020 competition which was held in Hollywood, Florida, United States on 16 May 2021. Although she was considered to be the drought-breaker for Malaysia in Miss Universe 2020, she did not make it into the semi-finals. Her journey was marked in the history of Miss Universe Malaysia pageant for 50 years of unplacement in Miss Universe pageant history.

Scandal 
During her reign as Miss Universe Malaysia 2020, James was exposed to a viral scandal, she was accused of having a past history of being a "nude model" on "adult websites", which she ultimately denied the allegations. But some pageant fans forced her to relinquish her crown as Miss Universe Malaysia for James's dishonorable actions.

References 

1995 births
Living people
Malaysian female models
Malaysian socialites
Malaysian beauty pageant winners
Miss Universe Malaysia
People from Kuching
People from Sarawak
Miss Universe 2020 contestants